Marcela Lopez (born October 13, 1982) is a Brazilian aerobic gymnast who finished 1st in the Women's Individual event at the 10th Aerobic Gymnastics World Championships held in Ulm

References

1982 births
Living people
Brazilian aerobic gymnasts
Female aerobic gymnasts
World Games gold medalists
Competitors at the 2009 World Games
Medalists at the Aerobic Gymnastics World Championships